The 2006 edition of the Paris–Tours marked the 100th anniversary on this one-day French semi-classic cycling race held between Paris and Tours held on October 8, 2006. The parcours was similar to that of previous years, with flattish terrain and a few short climbs at the end.

General Standings

2006-10-08: Saint-Arnoult-en-Yvelines – Tours, 254 km 

6th-place finisher Baden Cooke does not ride on a UCI ProTour team and is ineligible for points.

References

External links
Race website

2006
2006 UCI ProTour
2006 in French sport
October 2006 sports events in France